Harry James Jordan (February 14, 1873 – March 1, 1920) was a professional baseball player. He pitched for the Pittsburgh Pirates of the National League during parts of the 1894 and 1895 seasons. He later played in the Eastern League in 1896 and the Interstate League in 1897 and 1898.

External links

1873 births
1920 deaths
Major League Baseball pitchers
Baseball players from Pennsylvania
Pittsburgh Pirates players
19th-century baseball players
Brockton Shoemakers players
Springfield Ponies players
Syracuse Stars (minor league baseball) players
Youngstown Puddlers players
People from Titusville, Pennsylvania